Events in the year 2022 in Montenegro.

Incumbents 

 President: Milo Đukanović
 Prime Minister: Dritan Abazović

Events 
Ongoing — COVID-19 pandemic in Montenegro; Montenegrin nationalist protests (2020–present)

 4 February – The Government of Zdravko Krivokapić is ousted after a motion of no confidence passes 43–11.
 28 April – Dritan Abazović is elected by the Parliament of Montenegro as the new Prime Minister, succeeding Zdravko Krivokapić, who was ousted by a motion of censure on 4 February. 
 12 August – 2022 Cetinje shooting - A man kills a woman and two children at their home in Cetinje, before opening fire in the streets against random civilians, killing seven people and wounding six others. The perpetrator is later killed by an armed citizen.
 12 December – Protests and riots break out in front of the Parliament building of Montenegro after the adoption of amendments to the presidential bill.

Deaths

January 

 25 January - Dojčin Perazić, footballer (b. 1945)

April 

 4 April - Branislav Šoškić, politician (b. 1922)

References 

 
2020s in Montenegro
Years of the 21st century in Montenegro
Montenegro
Montenegro